The following are the basketball events that are expected to take place in 2016 throughout the world.

Tournaments include international (FIBA), professional (club) and amateur and collegiate levels.

National team tournaments
 June 13–19 - The 2016 FIBA World Olympic Qualifying Tournament for Women was staged at the city of Nantes in France.
The 5 teams below clinched a spot for the 2016 Olympic Basketball Games.

 July 4–10 - The 2016 FIBA World Olympic Qualifying Tournaments for Men was staged at Serbia, Italy and in the Philippines.
The 3 teams here below clinched a spot for the 2016 Olympic Basketball Games.

2016 Summer Olympics Basketball Tournament

Men
   United States

Women

FIBA World Under-17 Championships

Men
 2016 FIBA Under-17 World Championship in Spain:

Women
 2016 FIBA Under-17 World Championship for Women in Spain:

FIBA World Under-19 Championship qualifying

Men
 2016 FIBA Africa Under-18 Championship:
  
  
  
 2016 FIBA Americas Under-18 Championship:
  
  
  
 2016 FIBA Asia Under-18 Championship:
  
  
  
 2016 FIBA Europe Under-18 Championship:
  
  
  
 2016 FIBA Oceania Under-18 Championship:

Women
 2016 FIBA Africa Under-18 Championship for Women:
  
  
  
 2016 FIBA Americas Under-18 Championship for Women:
  
  
  
 2016 FIBA Asia Under-18 Championship for Women:
  
  
  
 2016 FIBA Europe Under-18 Championship for Women:
  
  
  
 2016 FIBA Oceania Under-18 Championship for Women:

Other FIBA tournaments

World Championships

Men

Women

FIBA Americas

Men
 2016 Centrobasket in Panama:

FIBA Asia
 2016 FIBA Asia Challenge in Iran:
  
  
  
 2016 FIBA Asia Champions Cup in China:
   China Kashgar
   Al-Riyadi
   Petrochimi
 2016 FIBA 3x3 Under-18 Asian Championships in Malaysia:

Professional club seasons

FIBA Intercontinental Cup

Continental seasons

Men

Transnational seasons

Men

Domestic league seasons

Men

Women

College seasons

Men's Division 

Other sources:

NAIA Division I:

NAIA Division II:

Women 
  NCAA
 Division I: Connecticut 82, Syracuse 51
 Women's National Invitation Tournament: South Dakota 71, Florida Gulf Coast 65
 Division II: Lubbock Christian 78, Alaska Anchorage 73
 Division III: Thomas More 83, Tufts 63
  NAIA
 Division I: MidAmerica Nazarene 49, Baker 35
 Division II: Marian 59, Southern Oregon 48
  CIS, 2016: Saskatchewan 85, Ryerson 71

Notable events
 February 3- The San Miguel Beermen won their 22nd championship in the 2015-16 PBA Philippine Cup Finals. They were the first professional basketball team in the world to win a title coming down from a 0-3 deficit in a best-of-7 finals series.
 April 13– Los Angeles Lakers legend Kobe Bryant played his final NBA game against the Utah Jazz as he finished his career with a 60-point performance. The 13th pick in the legendary 1996 Draft, Bryant won 5 championships with the Lakers, and is believed as one of the greatest basketball players of all time.
 April 13– The Golden State Warriors set the NBA single-season victory mark by notching their 73rd win in the season's final game. The Warriors finished the regular-season with a 73–9 record.
 April–All three NCAA division women's basketball champions finished with undefeated seasons - Connecticut (38–0), Lubbock Christian (35–0), Thomas More (33–0)
 June 19- The Cleveland Cavaliers won their 1st championship in the 2016 NBA Finals. The Cavs were the first in the NBA history to make a historic comeback in pursuit of title coming down from a 1-3  series deficit.
June 28- Legendary Tennessee basketball coach Pat Summitt dies at the age of 64; in her 38-year coaching career her 1,098 wins were the most of any men's or women's basketball coach.
 September 23- In the 2016 PBA Governors' Cup Playoffs, The Barangay Ginebra San Miguel made its first-ever Final 4 appearance after an 8-conference quarterfinal drought.
 October 9- Jimmy Alapag became the All-Time Leader in three-point shots made in the PBA history in the second game of the 2016 PBA Governors' Cup Finals.
 October 14- June Mar Fajardo settled a history after getting his third straight MVP award in the PBA Leo Awards, tying also with Bogs Adornado.
 October 19- The Barangay Ginebra San Miguel clinched their first ever championship in 8 years after defeating the Meralco Bolts with a 3-point buzzer beater made by Justin Brownlee, via a 91-88 victory in Game 6 of the 2016 PBA Governors' Cup Finals. This also count that its head coach, Tim Cone, won its 19th championship in his coaching career.

2016 in basketball results
 National Basketball Association:
 February 14- The Western Conference defeated the Eastern Conference in the  2016 NBA All-Star Game, 196-173.
 NBA Playoffs:
 Western Conference Finals: The Golden State Warriors defeated the Oklahoma City Thunder, 4 games to 3. This marked that the Warriors are the only 10th team in the league history to win a conference finals coming from a 1-3 series deficit.
 Eastern Conference Finals: The Cleveland Cavaliers defeated the Toronto Raptors, 4 games to 2. This series also marked that the Raptors are the first ever non-USA based basketball team to reach a conference finals.
 NBA Finals: The Eastern Conference Champions Cleveland Cavaliers defeated the Western Conference Champions, Golden State Warriors, 4 games to 3, to clinch their 1st ever championship in their franchise history.
 Philippine Basketball Association:
 February 3- The San Miguel Beermen defeated the Alaska Aces, 96-89, in Game 7 to win the 22nd PBA Crown and their back-to-back PBA Philippine Cup titles. This also marked a historic comeback from a 0-3 deficit in a best-of-7 finals series.
 May 18- The Rain or Shine Elasto Painters defeated the Alaska Aces in the 2016 PBA Commissioner's Cup Finals, 4 games to 2. This also marked where in the Painters clinched the title for only the 2nd time in their franchise. Also, this championship series marked that there was no team owned by the MVP Group of Companies and the San Miguel Corporation to ever reach the finals.

Deaths
 January 5 — Bob Armstrong, American NBA player (Philadelphia Warriors) (born 1933)
 January 7 — Bill Foster, American college coach (born 1929)
 January 7 — John Johnson, American NBA player (Cleveland Cavaliers, Portland Trail Blazers, Houston Rockets, Seattle SuperSonics) (born 1947)
 January 12 — Andrew Smith, American college (Butler) and professional (Neptūnas) player (born 1990)
 January 13 — Jim Simpson, American NBA and college announcer (born 1927)
 January 15 – Rex Morgan, American NBA player (Boston Celtics) (born 1948)
 January 15 – Buzzy Wilkinson, All-American college player (Virginia) (born 1932)
 January 17 – Sherron Mills, American player (BCM Gravelines, Mens Sana 1871 Basket) (born 1971)
 January 18 – Johnny Bach, American NBA player (Boston Celtics) and coach. (born 1924)
 January 23 – Bill Roberts, American NBA (St. Louis Bombers) and BAA (Boston Celtics, Chicago Stags) player (born 1925)
 January 23 – Bobby Wanzer, American Hall of Fame NBA player (Rochester Royals) and coach. (born 1921)
 January 27 – Augusto Giomo, Italian Olympic player (1960, 1964) (born 1940)
 January 27 – Carlos Loyzaga, Filipino Olympic (1952, 1956) and professional player and coach (born 1930)
 January 30 – Ken Sailors, American BAA/NBA player and college All-American (Wyoming) (born 1921)
 January 31 – Bob Pelkington, American college player (Xavier), NCAA leading rebounder (1964) (born 1941)
 February 6 – York Larese, American NBA player (Chicago Packers, Philadelphia Warriors) and ABA coach (New York Nets) (born 1938)
 February 12 – Bennie Purcell, American college player (Murray State) (born 1929)
 February 22 – Steve Harris, American NBA player (born 1963)
 February 23 – Eddie Parry, American NBL player (born 1918)
 February 24 – Eddie Einhorn, Hall of Fame college basketball television and radio executive (born 1936)
 March 2 – Aubrey McClendon, American co-owner of the Oklahoma City Thunder (born 1959)
 March 6 – Arto Koivisto, Finnish player (born 1930)
 March 8 – Esko Karhunen, Finnish Olympic player (born 1928)
 March 9 – Clyde Lovellette, American Hall of Fame NBA player (Minneapolis Lakers, Cincinnati Royals, St. Louis Hawks, Boston Celtics) (born 1929)
 March 12 – Larry Moore, 73, American ABA player (Anaheim Amigos).
 March 16 – Gene Short, American NBA player (Seattle SuperSonics, New York Knicks) (born 1953)
 March 27 – Vince Boryla, American NBA player and coach (New York Knicks), Olympic champion (1948) (born 1927)
 March 31 – Tom Butters, American athletic director (Duke) and former head of the NCAA Tournament selection committee (born 1939)
 March 31 – Eugene Parker, American college basketball player (Purdue) (born 1956)
 April 4 – Archie Dees, American NBA player (born 1936)
 April 5 – Ed Johnson, American ABA player (Los Angeles Stars, New York Nets, Texas Chaparrals) (born 1945)
 April 6 – Murray Wier, American NBA player (Tri-Cities Blackhawks) (born 1926)
 April 11 – Ed Snider, American NBA owner (Philadelphia 76ers) (born 1933)
 April 13 – Nera White, American Hall of Fame player (born 1935)
 April 16 – Ron Bonham, American NBA/ABA player (Boston Celtics, Indiana Pacers) (born 1942)
 April 19 – John McConathy, American NBA player (Milwaukee Hawks) (born 1930)
 April 20 – Dwayne Washington, American college All-American (Syracuse) and NBA player (New Jersey Nets, Miami Heat) (born 1964)
 April 26 – Ozzie Silna, American ABA owner (Carolina Cougars/Spirits of St. Louis) (born 1932)
 May 2 – Al Ferrari, American NBA player (St. Louis Hawks, Chicago Zephyrs) (born 1933)
 May 9 – Rex Hughes, American college (Kent State) and NBA coach (Sacramento Kings) (born 1938)
 May 16 – Jim McMillian, American NBA player (Los Angeles Lakers) (born 1948)
 May 28 – Bryce Dejean-Jones, American NBA player (New Orleans Pelicans) (born 1992)
 June 2 – Lee Pfund, American college coach (Wheaton) (born 1919)
 June 7 – Sean Rooks, American NBA player (born 1969)
 June 9 – Brooks Thompson, American NBA player and college coach (UTSA) (born 1970)
 June 22 – Roberto Lovera, Uruguayan Olympic bronze medalist (1952) (born 1922)
 June 25 – Hal Lear, All-American college (Temple) and NBA player (Philadelphia Warriors) (born 1935)
 June 26 – Gino Sovran, Canadian BAA player (Toronto Huskies) (born 1924)
 June 28 – Pat Summitt, Hall of Fame college basketball coach (Tennessee Lady Volunteers) (born 1952)
 June 30 – Witold Zagórski, Polish Olympic player (1964, 1968, 1972) (born 1930)
 July 3 – Gilbert Bulawan, Filipino PBA player (Blackwater Elite) (born 1986)
 July 5 – Kari Hautala, Finnish player (Torpan Pojat) (born 1973)
 July 9 – Vaughn Harper, American college player (Syracuse) (born 1945)
 July 10 – Harry Wade, Canadian Olympic player (1952) (born 1928)
 July 16 – Bennie Lenox, American college player (Texas A&M) (born 1941)
 July 16 – Nate Thurmond, American Hall of Fame NBA player (San Francisco Warriors, Chicago Bulls, Cleveland Cavaliers) (born 1941)
 July 17 – Raúl Feliciano, Puerto Rican player (University of Puerto Rico, Santos de San Juan, Cardenales de Río Piedras) (born 1930)
 July 25 – Dwight Jones, American NBA player and Olympic silver medalist (1972) (born 1952)
 July 28 – Bob Brown, American NBA player (Providence Steamrollers, Denver Nuggets) (born 1923)
 August 3 – Abdul Jeelani, American NBA player (Portland Trail Blazers, Dallas Mavericks) (born 1954)
 August 4 – Albert Nicholas, All-American college player (Wisconsin Badgers) (born 1931)
 August 10 – John Saunders, Canadian/American NBA television play by play announcer (born 1955)
 August 13 – Allen Kelley, American college national champion at Kansas (1952) and Olympic gold medalist (1960) (born 1932)
 August 15 – Richard Wackar, American college coach (Rowan) (born 1928)
 August 17 – Baby Dalupan, Filipino college and professional coach (born 1923)
 August 22 – Michael Brooks, All-American college player (La Salle) and NBA player (born 1958)
 August 22 – Paul Landreaux, American college coach (El Camino College, Saint Mary's) (born 1943)
 August 24 – Nina Yeryomina, Russian player, World Champion (1959) (born 1933)
 September 22 – George Hanson, American college coach (Minnesota) (born 1935)
 September 26 – Jack Cotton, American NBA player (Denver Nuggets) (born 1924)
 October 4 – Cameron Moore, American Serie A player (Reyer Venezia Mestre) (born 1990)
 October 6 – Fred Slaughter, American national champion college player (UCLA) (born 1942)
 October 16 – Viktor Zubkov, Soviet Olympic silver medalist (1956, 1960) (born 1937)
 October 19 – Tommy Bartlett, American college coach (Chattanooga, Florida) (born 1928)
 October 21 – David Pope, American NBA player (Kansas City Kings, Seattle SuperSonics) (born 1962)
 October 21 – Jerry Rullo, American BAA/NBA player (Philadelphia Warriors, Baltimore Bullets) (born 1923)
 October 22 – Bob Vanatta, American college coach (Missouri State, Memphis, Missouri) (born 1918)
 November 9 – Greg Ballard, American NBA player (Washington Bullets, Golden State Warriors, Seattle SuperSonics) (born 1955)
 November 20 — Gene Guarilia, American NBA player (Boston Celtics) (born 1937)
 November 24 — Norm Swanson, American NBA player (Rochester Royals) (born 1930)
 November 26 — Harry Flournoy, American college player (UTEP), NCAA champion (1966) (born 1943)
 December 15 — Craig Sager, American NBA sideline reporter (born 1951)
 December 18 — Sonny Moran, American college coach (Morris Harvey, West Virginia) (born 1926)
 December 24 — Pape Badiane, French player (Chorale Roanne, Le Mans, Poitiers Basket 86) (born 1980)
 December 31 — Orvis Sigler, American college coach (Army, Centenary) (born 1922)

See also
 Timeline of women's basketball

References